Metro Airport may refer to
Metro/Airport station, a VTA railway station in California
Van Nuys Airport in California, formerly known as Metropolitan Airport
Detroit Metropolitan Wayne County Airport near Detroit, Michigan
Metropolitan Airports Commission, the agency that owns and operates airports in the Twin Cities region
Mesquite Metro Airport in Texas

See also